Catherine Ann Jones is a playwright, screenwriter, and author.  She wrote the screenplay for the film The Christmas Wife  and Unlikely Angel.  She wrote several episodes of the television series Touched by an Angel.

Education and career

Catherine Ann Jones holds a graduate degree in Depth Psychology and Archetypal Mythology from Pacifica Graduate Institute where she has also taught. After playing major roles in over fifty plays on and off-Broadway, she became disappointed by the lack of good roles for women and wrote a play, On the Edge, about Virginia Woolf and her struggle with madness in a world gone mad, Hitler and WWII. The play won a National Endowment for the Arts Award. Eleven of her plays, including Calamity Jane (both play and musical), The Women of Cedar Creek, and Freud’s Oracle, have won multiple awards and are produced both in and out of New York. Her films include The Christmas Wife (1988), Unlikely Angel (1996), and the TV series Touched by an Angel. A Fulbright Research Scholar to India studying shamanism, she has taught at The New School University, University of Southern California, the Esalen Institute and the Omega Institute for Holistic Studies.

Books
Jones has written six books:

 The Way of Story: The Craft & Soul of Writing
 Heal Your Self with Writing (Nautilus Book Award 2014)
 What Story Are You Living?
 Freud's Oracle
 True Fables: Stories from Childhood
 Buddha and the Dancing Girl: A Creative Life

Personal life

When Jones was 19 she met the East Indian writer and novelist Raja Rao who was lecturing on Indian philosophy at the University of Texas, Austin. They were married in Paris in 1965 and had one son, Christopher Rama Rao. The twenty-year marriage ended in divorce in 1986.

References

American women dramatists and playwrights
Living people
American women screenwriters
American women television writers
American stage actresses
The New School faculty
University of Southern California faculty
20th-century American dramatists and playwrights
20th-century American actresses
20th-century American women writers
21st-century American dramatists and playwrights
21st-century American women writers
Year of birth missing (living people)
Screenwriters from New York (state)
Screenwriters from California
American television writers
American women academics
Fulbright alumni